First State may refer to:

 The official nickname of Delaware
 First State (group), Dutch trance act formed in the year 2005

Parks
 First State Heritage Park, in Dover, Delaware
 First State National Historical Park, in Delaware and Pennsylvania

See also
 First State Bank (disambiguation)
 First State Super, Australian superannuation fund
 First Statement, Canadian literary magazine